Siavash Daneshvar is an Iranian communist political activist and one a member of Central Committee and Permanent Council of Political Bureau of Worker-communist Unity Party. He was also the Director of Radio International. The radio which was broadcast on Iran for years and represented Worker-Communist Party of Iran. Daneshvar lives and works in Sweden.

References

Living people
Worker-communism Unity Party of Iran politicians
Iranian communists
Year of birth missing (living people)
Place of birth missing (living people)